Later Balhae or Later Bohai (927–935) was a state hypothesized to have existed in Manchuria. It emerged after Balhae(Bohai) was destroyed by the Liao dynasty. Later Balhae is considered by some to be the first of several successor states to Balhae after its fall to the Liao dynasty in 926. 

The existence of Later Balhae was first proposed by Japanese scholar Hino Kaizaburo in 1943 and subsequently supported by some South Korean scholars. Outside of South Korea, "Later Balhae" is usually understood as a name for the kingdom of Dongdan or other polities on the former territory of Balhae.

History
After the fall of Balhae, part of the land was annexed by the Khitan-led Liao dynasty, and part was incorporated into the Liao vassal Dongdan Kingdom, and the rest was inhabited by the Koguryo people who retained independence. The conquered people of Balhae immediately began rebelling against the Liao dynasty.

Starting in 927, the Khitans had begun to hunt down and execute all members of the royal family in order to destroy any chance of a new ruler to take the throne. However, several members of the royal family survived.

Among them were Crown Prince Dae Gwang-hyeon. The Crown Prince took Balhae refugees, mostly former Goguryeo people, and escaped down to their southern neighbor, Goryeo, where the newly-risen King Taejo of Goryeo accepted them with generosity.

The Dae clan then united the western Amnok River resistance groups and established "Later Balhae" at Holohan Fortress, in 927.

However, general Yeol Manhwa took control in a coup and established Jeongan (Ding'an) in 935.

See also
Balhae
Jeongan
Heungyo

References

External links 

Balhae
History of Manchuria
Former countries in Chinese history
Former countries in Korean history